The Hanthawaddy Kingdom (also Hanthawaddy Pegu or simply Pegu) was the polity that ruled lower Burma (Myanmar) from 1287 to 1539 and from 1550 to 1552. The Mon-speaking kingdom was founded as Ramaññadesa by King Wareru following the collapse of the Pagan Empire in 1287 as a nominal vassal state of the Sukhothai Kingdom and of the Mongol Yuan dynasty. The kingdom became formally independent of Sukhothai in 1330 but remained a loose federation of three major regional power centres: the Irrawaddy Delta, Bago, and Mottama. Its kings had little or no authority over the vassals. Mottama was in open rebellion from 1363 to 1388.

History

The energetic reign of King Razadarit (r. 1384–1421) cemented the kingdom's existence. Razadarit firmly unified the three Mon-speaking regions: Myaungmya, Donwun and Martaban; and successfully fended off the northern Burmese-speaking Ava Kingdom in the Forty Years' War (1385–1424), making the western kingdom of Rakhine a tributary from 1413 to 1421 in the process. The war ended in a stalemate but it was a victory for Hanthawaddy as Ava finally gave up its dream of restoring the Pagan Empire. In the years following the war, Pegu occasionally aided Ava's southern vassal states of Prome and Taungoo in their rebellions but carefully avoided getting plunged into a full-scale war.

After the war, Hanthawaddy entered its golden age whereas its rival Ava gradually went into decline. From the 1420s to the 1530s, Hanthawaddy was the most powerful and prosperous kingdom of all post-Pagan kingdoms. Under a string of especially gifted monarchs – Binnya Ran I, Shin Sawbu, Dhammazedi and Binnya Ran II – the kingdom enjoyed a long golden age, profiting from foreign commerce. Its merchants traded with traders from across the Indian Ocean, filling the king's treasury with gold and silver, silk and spices. The kingdom also became a famous centre of Theravada Buddhism. It established strong ties with Sri Lanka and encouraged reforms that later spread throughout the country.

The powerful kingdom's end came abruptly. Since the late 15th century, Ava had tried to win the support of the Taungoo dynasty by entering into marriage alliances with King Mingyi Nyo, however from 1534 onwards, Ava came under constant raids by the Taungoo dynasty from Upper Burma. King Takayutpi could not marshal the kingdom's much greater resources and manpower against the much smaller Taungoo, led by King Tabinshwehti and his deputy general Bayinnaung. Taungoo captured Bago and the Irrawaddy Delta in 1538–9, and Mottama in 1541. The surrendered Pegu officials were given amnesty and a pardon by Bayinnaung, they accepted, and were placed in their old positions.

Hanthawaddy briefly revived in 1550 after Tabinshwehti was assassinated. But the "kingdom" did not extend much outside the city of Bago. Bayinnaung quickly defeated the rebellion in March 1552. Though Taungoo kings would rule all of Lower Burma well into the mid-18th century, the golden age of Hanthawaddy was fondly remembered by the Mon people of Lower Burma. In 1740, they rose up against a weak Taungoo Dynasty on its last legs, and founded the Restored Hanthawaddy Kingdom.

See also

 List of Hanthawaddy monarchs
 Hanthawaddy kings family tree

References

Bibliography
 
 
 
 

 
Former countries in Burmese history
Former kingdoms
Burmese monarchy
13th century in Burma
14th century in Burma
15th century in Burma
16th century in Burma
States and territories established in 1287
States and territories disestablished in 1552
1315 establishments in Asia
1365 disestablishments in Asia